Outlive Your Enemies is the fourth studio album by Babyland, released in 1998 by Mattress Recordings.

Reception

Ned Raggett of AllMusic awarded Outlive Your Enemies four out of five stars, describing the album as "brilliant" and saying "captured the duo still slamming out some gripping electronic rage, but with a new tunefulness and drama that made them even more special than before." The critic also said it "Babyland play around with a variety of sounds and approaches on Outlive, some being newer takes on older approaches -- the synth-horn driven grandeur of "Hillhurst," the frazzled protest in "Mini Mall."

Track listing

Personnel 
Adapted from the Outlive Your Enemies liner notes.

Babyland
 Dan Gatto – lead vocals, keyboards
 Michael Smith – percussion

Production and design
 Aartvark – cover art, photography
 Babyland – production
 Michael Rozon – production, recording, mixing, mastering

Release history

References

External links 
 
 Outlive Your Enemies at iTunes

1998 albums
Babyland albums